WBYS (1560 kHz) is an AM radio station licensed for Canton, Illinois.

In September 2013, a 250-watt low-power FM translator (W229BZ) was leased and added as a simulcast of WBYS on the FM dial at 93.7 FM.

The station broadcasts St. Louis Cardinal baseball. WBYS also carries the Chicago Bulls, University of Illinois football and basketball, and high school football, boys and girls basketball, baseball and softball.

History 
WBYS began broadcasting October 5, 1947, on 1560 kHz with 250 W power (daytime only). It was owned by Fulton County Broadcasting Company. Broadcasting magazine reported that more than 3,500 people attended an open house in the station's new building.

References

External links

Canton, Illinois
Full service radio stations in the United States
BYS
Radio stations established in 1947
1947 establishments in Illinois